James Davis "Jimmy" Blacklock (born August 28, 1980) is an American attorney and judge currently serving as an associate justice of the Texas Supreme Court.

Background 

Blacklock was born in Missouri City, Texas, where he attended public school throughout his primary education. He graduated from the University of Texas at Austin with a Bachelor of Arts degree in history. He then went to Yale Law School and clerked for Judge Jerry Edwin Smith of the United States Court of Appeals for the Fifth Circuit.

Career 

After clerking for Judge Smith, Blacklock was appointed to the Civil Rights Division within the United States Department of Justice by President George W. Bush. Before his tenure as a judge, Blacklock served as General Counsel to then Texas Attorney General Greg Abbott and continued to serve Governor Abbott as general counsel until his appointment to the Texas Supreme Court on January 2, 2018.

Electoral history 

Blacklock was up for election for the first time on November 6, 2018. He defeated Democratic challenger Steven Kirkland, a district court judge in Harris County (Houston), with 53.16% of the statewide votes. The statewide turnout in this race was 51.74%.

Notable Cases 

In August 2021, Blacklock, writing for the Texas Supreme Court, ruled that the Texas Constitution "authorize[s] each [legislative] chamber to compel the attendance of absent members, by physical compulsion if necessary." The ruling was in response to Texas House Democrats fleeing the state to deny the chamber the quorum needed to vote on a controversial election bill.

In February 2022, Governor Abbott ordered the Texas Department of Family and Protective Services (DFPS) to investigate child abuse claims filed against parents who might be providing their transgender children with gender-transition procedures.  After the ensuing legal battle, Blacklock wrote for an unanimous Court to strike down a state-wide injunction issued by a federal judge blocking investigation into parents of transgender youths, but he also ruled that the governor did not have the authority to order such investigations.  However, Blacklock and two other justices dissented from the Court's decision to block investigation into Doe's family, who had initiated the lawsuit against Abbott.

Personal life 

Blacklock lives in Austin with his wife and their three daughters, where they are members of All Saints Presbyterian Church.

References

External links 
 Campaign website
 Biography at Supreme Court of Texas

1980 births
Place of birth missing (living people)
Living people
21st-century American lawyers
21st-century American judges
Federalist Society members
George W. Bush administration personnel
Texas lawyers
Texas Republicans
Justices of the Texas Supreme Court
United States Department of Justice lawyers
University of Texas at Austin College of Liberal Arts alumni
Yale Law School alumni